"I'll Never Stop Loving You" is a song written by Dave Loggins and J.D. Martin, and recorded by American country music artist Gary Morris.  It was released in July 1985 as the first single from the album Anything Goes.  The song was Morris' second number one country hit. The single went to number one for one week and spent a total of fifteen weeks on the country chart.

Chart performance

References

1985 singles
1985 songs
Gary Morris songs
Songs written by Dave Loggins
Song recordings produced by Jim Ed Norman
Warner Records singles
Songs written by J. D. Martin (songwriter)